Benjamin Tetteh (born 10 July 1997) is a Ghanaian professional footballer who plays as a striker for Hull City and the Ghana national team.

Club career
Tetteh joined Standard Liège in 2015 from Dreams FC, signing a three-year deal. On 17 October 2015, he made his Belgian Pro League debut with Standard Liège against K.V.C. Westerlo.

In July 2018, Tetteh moved to Sparta Prague.

In July 2021, he joined Yeni Malatyaspor.

In July 2022, Tetteh signed for Hull City. He made his debut as a 64th-minute substitute for Óscar Estupiñán on 30 July 2022 in the home match against Bristol City. He won his side's penalty to equalise the score, coming under criticism after the match for the minimal contact that caused him to go down.

He scored his first league goal for Hull on 3 March 2023 in a 2–0 home win over West Brom.

International career
Tetteh made his debut for the Ghana national team on 9 October 2021 in a World Cup qualifier against Zimbabwe.

On 16 January 2022, Tetteh was sent off in the 94th minute of a 1–1 Africa Cup of Nations group stage draw with Gabon after punching an opposition player in a brawl at full-time. Tetteh was subsequently handed a three match ban by the CAF.

Career statistics

Honours 
Standard Liège
 Belgian Cup: 2015–16

Sparta Prague
 Czech Cup: 2019–20

References

External links

 
 

1997 births
Living people
Footballers from Accra
Ghanaian footballers
Association football forwards
Ghana international footballers
Ghana under-20 international footballers
Belgian Pro League players
Czech First League players
Süper Lig players
Standard Liège players
1. FC Slovácko players
Bohemians 1905 players
AC Sparta Prague players
Yeni Malatyaspor footballers
Hull City A.F.C. players
Ghanaian expatriate sportspeople in Belgium
Expatriate footballers in Belgium
Ghanaian expatriate sportspeople in the Czech Republic
Expatriate footballers in the Czech Republic
Ghanaian expatriate sportspeople in Turkey
Expatriate footballers in Turkey
Ghanaian expatriate sportspeople in England
Expatriate footballers in England
2021 Africa Cup of Nations players
English Football League players